Goran Stanić (born 8 September 1972) is a Macedonian former professional footballer who played as a defender.

Club career
Stanić scored his first goal in Scottish League Football for St Johnstone with a 35-yard strike against Hamilton in October 2005. His form improved as the season progressed, resulting in a couple of supporters' awards at the end of the campaign.

In April 2007, Stanić was one of three St Johnstone players named in the SPFA's Scottish Division One "Team of the Year", voted for by the managers.

Stanic spent three seasons with St Johnstone but in April 2008, it was announced that he had joined Third Division champions East Fife on a two-year contract. During his time in Perth, Stanic made 127 appearances for St Johnstone in all competitions, scoring once. He appeared in two Scottish Cup semi-finals and one League Cup semi-final, and was part of the side that won the Challenge Cup in November 2007. He officially signed for East Fife in June 2008. He was then released at the end of the 2009–10 season.

International career
Stanić won the last of his two international caps in a 5–0 friendly defeat to Hungary in November 2001, two years after winning his other cap in a 1–1 draw with the Republic of Ireland in Skopje in a Euro 2000 qualifier.

Coaching career
Stanić has held several positions with North Macedonia national team since 2017, coaching the youth teams.

Honours
St Johnstone
Scottish Challenge Cup: 2007–08

References

External links
 
 
 Macedonian Football 

1972 births
Living people
Footballers from Skopje
Macedonian people of Serbian descent
Association football defenders
Macedonian footballers
North Macedonia international footballers
FK Vardar players
UE Lleida players
FK Cementarnica 55 players
FK Rabotnički players
FK Rad players
Raith Rovers F.C. players
Livingston F.C. players
St Johnstone F.C. players
East Fife F.C. players
Macedonian First Football League players
Segunda División players
First League of Serbia and Montenegro players
Scottish Football League players
Scottish Premier League players
Macedonian expatriate footballers
Expatriate footballers in Spain
Macedonian expatriate sportspeople in Spain
Expatriate footballers in Serbia and Montenegro
Macedonian expatriate sportspeople in Serbia and Montenegro
Expatriate footballers in Scotland
Macedonian expatriate sportspeople in Scotland
Macedonian football managers